Chlamydastis caecata is a moth of the family Depressariidae. It is found in French Guiana.

The wingspan is about 24 mm. The forewings are violet-fuscous with several small light dull greenish spots traversing the wing before the middle, one representing the plical stigma is larger. There is a dark violet-fuscous triangular apical patch, its edge running from beyond the middle of the costa to the tornus, slightly convex, marked towards the termen in the middle with a round blackish blotch resting on its anterior edge, suffused posteriorly but finely whitish-edged anteriorly. The hindwings are dark fuscous.

References

Moths described in 1916
Chlamydastis